Dukhovets is a rural locality (a khutor) in Voroshnevsky Selsoviet Rural Settlement, Kursky District, Kursk Oblast, Russia. Population:

Geography 
The khutor is located 79 km from the Russia–Ukraine border, 12 km south-west of Kursk, 1.5 km from the selsoviet center – Voroshnevo.

 Streets
There are the following streets in the locality: Simferopolskaya, Solnechnaya 1-ya and Solnechnaya 2-ya (174 houses).

 Climate
Dukhovets has a warm-summer humid continental climate (Dfb in the Köppen climate classification).

Transport 
Dukhovets is located on the federal route  Crimea Highway (a part of the European route ), 5 km from the nearest railway station Ryshkovo (railway line Lgov I — Kursk).

The rural locality is situated 20 km from Kursk Vostochny Airport, 115 km from Belgorod International Airport and 220 km from Voronezh Peter the Great Airport.

References

Notes

Sources

Rural localities in Kursky District, Kursk Oblast